In May 1890, on his arrival in Auvers-sur-Oise, Vincent van Gogh continued his work mainly with size 30 canvases, and created more than a dozen such paintings.

References
 Dorn, Roland:

Auvers size 30 canvases
Auvers size 30 canvases
Paintings of Auvers-sur-Oise by Vincent van Gogh
Series of paintings by Vincent van Gogh